StyxWorld Live 2001 is a live album by the band Styx released in 2001. It is drawn from performances at the Kosei Nenken Hall, Tokyo, Japan, February 10–11, 2000, Stadthalle, Offenbach, Germany, October 27, 2000, and the Shaw Center, Edmonton, Alberta, Canada, February 11, 2001.

Track listing
 "Rockin' the Paradise" (James "J.Y." Young, Tommy Shaw, Dennis DeYoung) - 4:12
 "High Enough" (T. Shaw, Jack Blades, Ted Nugent) - 2:07
 "Lorelei" (J. Young, D. DeYoung) - 4:07
 "A Criminal Mind" (Lawrence Gowan) - 5:59 +
 "Love Is the Ritual" (Glen Burtnik, Plinky) - 5:31
 "Boat on the River" (T. Shaw) - 4:25
 "Half-Penny, Two-Penny" (J. Young, Ray Brandle) - 6:35
 "Sing for the Day" (T. Shaw) - 4:22
 "Snowblind" (J. Young, D. DeYoung) - 5:22
 "Sometimes Love Just Ain't Enough" (G. Burtnik, Patty Smyth) - 2:45
 "Crystal Ball" (T. Shaw) - 6:28
 "Miss America" (J. Young) - 6:19
 "Come Sail Away" (D. DeYoung) - 10:11

+ Produced by Lawrence Gowan

Personnel
Tommy Shaw: Vocals, Electric & Acoustic Guitar, Mandolin
James "J.Y." Young: Vocals, Electric & Acoustic Guitar, Keyboards
Lawrence Gowan: Vocals, Keyboards 
Glen Burtnik: Vocals, Bass, Electric Guitar
Chuck Panozzo: Bass 
Todd Sucherman: Drums

References

2001 live albums
Styx (band) live albums